Island House is a former merchant's house and Grade II listed building on the Barbican in Plymouth, Devon, England.

History 

Built between the 1570s and 1600s, it is known for being the last place of accommodation for the Pilgrim Fathers on English soil, prior to them setting sail on the Mayflower on 6 September 1620.

Construction 

It is a local example of a jettied merchant's house.

Present day

Island House has maintained its Grade II listed status, until  2010 as a tourist information centre and since then an ice cream shop.

A blue plaque from 1976 can be found beside the shop entrance describing Island House as "one of the houses where a group of English puritans, since known as the Pilgrim Fathers, were entertained ashore prior to their final departure for America on the 6th September 1620 in the 'Mayflower'".

References

Buildings and structures in Plymouth, Devon
Grade II listed buildings in Devon